Clinidium ashei is a species of ground beetle in the subfamily Rhysodinae. It was described by Ross Bell & J.R. Bell in 2009 and named after entomologist James S. Ashe. It is endemic to the high mountains of western Panama (Chiriquí Province).

Clinidium ashei measure  in length.

References

Clinidium
Beetles of Central America
Endemic fauna of Panama
Beetles described in 2009